The fourth season of Phineas and Ferb first aired on Disney Channel on December 7, 2012, and December 31, 2012, for Disney XD. The season features two step-brothers trying to make every day the best day ever, while their sister tries to bust them. The five main characters are brothers Phineas Flynn and Ferb Fletcher, the brothers' older sister Candace Flynn, secret agent Perry the Platypus (who is also the pet of Phineas and Ferb) and the evil scientist Dr. Heinz Doofenshmirtz.

Production
On August 25, 2011, the series was renewed for a fourth season as part of a deal between Dan Povenmire, Jeff "Swampy" Marsh, and Disney, along with a feature film and possible spin-off. On November 9, 2011, the season was officially picked up, with new episodes rolling out until 2014.

Disney, the owner of Marvel Entertainment since 2009, announced that the Marvel heroes Spider-Man, Iron Man, Hulk, and Thor would appear on a crossover episode, which premiered on August 16, 2013.

On February 15, 2014, it was announced that work on this season was complete and the show will go on an indefinite hiatus. However, Dan Povenmire mentioned the crew was now working on new episodes. In a July 2014 article on The Daily Beast, Povenmire said they were finishing up 20 episodes that have yet to air.

The episode "Doof 101" was intended as a backdoor pilot for a spin-off series that focused on Dr. Doofenshmirtz becoming a high school science teacher, but was not picked up.

On May 7, 2015, it was announced that the fourth season would be the series’ final season and the series finale event titled "Last Day of Summer" would premiere on June 12, 2015. A stand-alone special titled "The O.W.C.A. Files" aired on November 9, 2015, on Disney XD and on January 15, 2016, on Disney Channel. Two additional seasons were greenlit in January 2023.

Episodes

Notes

References

External links

2012 American television seasons
2013 American television seasons
2014 American television seasons
2015 American television seasons